William Campbell Rough Bryden  (12 April 1942 – 5 January 2022) was a Scottish stage and film director and screenwriter.

Early life and career
He worked as a trainee with Scottish Television before becoming assistant director at the Belgrade Theatre, Coventry, in 1965. He then worked as a director at the Royal Court Theatre (1967–1971), the Royal Lyceum Theatre, Edinburgh (1972–1975), Associate Director at the National Theatre (1975–1985); and as a visiting director in Glasgow and New York. In 1990, he directed Leoš Janáček's The Cunning Little Vixen, at the Royal Opera House. He was Head of Television Drama at BBC Scotland (1984-1993) and has also done other work for film and television, as screenwriter, director and executive producer.

Personal life and death
In 1970 he married the Hon. Deborah Morris, a potter, who was a daughter of IOC President Michael Morris, 3rd Baron Killanin. They had two children, Dillon and Mary Kate. The couple divorced in 1988.

In the same year, he met actress Angela Douglas at a dinner party arranged by mutual friend Marsha Hunt. They lived together in west London and were married at City Hall, New York City, in February 2009.

National Life Stories conducted an oral history interview (C1316/11) with Bill Bryden in 2009 for its Legacy of the English Stage Company collection held by the British Library.

Bryden died on 5 January 2022, at the age of 79.

Honours
Bryden was appointed a Commander of the Order of the British Empire (CBE) in 1993.

Work

Film director 
1983: Ill Fares the Land
1986: The Holy City
1987: Aria (segment)
1992: Six Characters in Search of an Author

Writer 
1975: Benny Lynch, Scenes from a Short Life : a Play Benny Lynch: Scenes from a Short Life : a Play
1976: Willie Rough, a BBC Play for Today
1977: Old Movies
1980: The Long Riders (film)
1981: Civilians, a play

Theatre director 

1972: Kidnapped – Royal Lyceum 
1974: Romeo and Juliet - Old Vic
1974: Spring Awakening – Old Vic
1974: Romeo and Juliet – Old Vic
1975: The Playboy of the Western World – Old Vic
1976: Watch It Come Down – Old Vic then National Theatre 
1976: Il Campiello – National Theatre
1976: Counting the Ways – National Theatre
1977 (with Sebastian Graham Jones): The Passion – National Theatre
1977: Old Movies – National Theatre
1977: The Plough and the Stars – National Theatre
1978 (with Sebastian Graham Jones): Lark Rise – National Theatre
1978: American Buffalo – National Theatre
1978 (with Sebastian Graham Jones): The World Turned Upside Down – National Theatre
1978: The Long Voyage Home – National Theatre
1978: Dispatches – National Theatre
1979 (with Sebastian Graham Jones): Candleford – National Theatre
1980: Hughie – National Theatre
1980: The Iceman Cometh – National Theatre
1980: The Nativity – National Theatre
1980: The Crucible – National Theatre
1981: Civilians (writer & director) - Scottish Theatre Company
1982: Don Quixote - National Theatre
1982: A Midsummer Night's Dream – National Theatre
1983: Glengarry Glen Ross – National Theatre (World Premiere) then Mermaid Theatre, London
1983: Cinderella - National Theatre
1984: Golden Boy - National Theatre
1985: Doomsday, presented with The Nativity and The Passion, as the Mysteries from medieval Mystery plays in a version by Tony Harrison – National Theatre
1989: A Life in the Theatre - Theatre Royal then Strand Theatre, London
1989: Op Hoop Van Zegen - Ro Theatre Rotterdam, The Netherlands
1990: The Ship (writer & director) Harland & Wolff Shed, Govan, Glasgow
1994: A Month in the Country by Ivan Turgenev, starring Helen Mirren and John Hurt. Yvonne Arnaud Theatre and West End
1994: The Big Picnic (writer & director) - Harland & Wolff, Govan, Glasgow
1995: Son of Man - The Pit, RSC, London
1996: Uncle Vanya - Minerva Theatre, Chichester then Albery Theare, London
1999: The Mysteries - The Nativity - National Theatre
1999: The Mysteries - The Passion - National Theatre
1999: The Mysteries - Doomsday - National Theatre
2001: The Good Hope – National Theatre
2005: Romeo and Juliet – Birmingham Repertory Theatre
2005: The Creeper – Theatre Royal Windsor

Opera director 
1988: Parsifal by Richard Wagner - Royal Opera House, London
1990: The Cunning Little Vixen by Leoš Janáček - Royal Opera House, London
2000: The Silver Tassie - English National Opera, London

 Awards and nominations
1985: Laurence Olivier Theatre Award for Best Director, The Mysteries.
1985: London Critics' Circle Theatre Awards for Best Director for The Mysteries1985: London Evening Standard Theatre Award for Best Director for The MysteriesFurther reading
Craig, Cairns (1980), Fearful Selves: Character, Community and the Scottish Imagination, in Cencrastus No. 4, Winter 1980-81, pp. 29 - 32,
McArthur, Colin (1983), Tendencies in the New Scottish Cinema, in Hearn, Sheils G. (ed.), Cencrastus'' No. 13, Summer 1983, pp. 33 – 35,

References

External links

 

1942 births
2022 deaths
British theatre directors
Commanders of the Order of the British Empire
Laurence Olivier Award winners
Scottish theatre directors
People from Greenock